Heart Full of Love is the fifth studio album by American country music singer Holly Dunn. It includes the singles "You Really Had Me Going" and "Heart Full of Love," which respectively reached #1 and #19 on the Hot Country Songs charts. Also included is a cover of Marty Robbins's 1961 single "Don't Worry."

Critical reception
Stereo Review praised Dunn's "maturing vocal control" and said that "her songwriting, too, shows growing versatility".

Track listing

Personnel
Grace Mihi Bahng - cello on "When No Place Is Home"
Eddie Bayers - drums on all tracks except "You Really Had Me Going"
Holly Dunn - lead vocals, background vocals
Pat Flynn - acoustic guitar
Paul Franklin - steel guitar, dobro, pedabro, "The Box"
Steve Gibson - acoustic guitar, electric guitar, fretted dobro, gut string guitar
Rob Hajacos - fiddle
Connie Heard - violin on "When No Place Is Home"
Bill Hullet - acoustic guitar, lap steel guitar
Roy Huskey Jr. - upright bass
The Jordanaires - background vocals on "Don't Worry"
Chris Leuzinger - acoustic guitar, 12-string guitar
Brent Mason - electric guitar on "You Really Had Me Going"
Terry McMillan - harmonica
Edgar Meyer - string arrangements on "When No Place Is Home"
Farrell Morris - marimba
Mark O'Connor - violin on "When No Place Is Home"
Don Potter - acoustic guitar
Brent Truitt - mandolin, mandola
Chris Waters - acoustic guitar, background vocals
Kris Wilkinson - viola on "When No Place Is Home"
Lonnie Wilson - drums on "You Really Had Me Going", background vocals on "Temporary Loss of Memory"
Glenn Worf - bass guitar, tic-tac bass

Chart performance

References

Holly Dunn albums
1990 albums
Warner Records albums